Petrimagnia horricoma is a species of beetle in the family Carabidae, the only species in the genus Petrimagnia.

References

Lebiinae